North Berwick High School is a non-denominational state secondary school in North Berwick, East Lothian, Scotland.

See also
People educated at North Berwick High School

References

External links
 North Berwick High School website
 Scottish Schools Online

Secondary schools in East Lothian
1893 establishments in Scotland
Educational institutions established in 1893
North Berwick